Yun Young-su is a South Korean writer.

Life 
Yun Young-su was born in 1952 in Dongsung-dong, Jongno-gu, Seoul. She graduated from Gyeonggi Girls’ Middle School and Gyeonggi Girls’ High School. In 1975, she graduated from Seoul National University in historical education. Afterwards, she became a teacher at Yeouido Middle School. In 1979, she transferred to Daebang Girls’ Middle School before stopping teaching in 1980. She began writing in 1987, when she took a fiction writing class at the Culture and Arts Foundation. In 1990, when she was thirty eight, her short story “Saengtaegwanchal” (생태관찰 Ecology observation) was published in Modern Fiction and won the Modern Literature New Writer’s Prize. Later, she pursued an active career, publishing various collections such as Jaringobiui jukeumeul aedoham (자린고비의 죽음을 애도함 Mourning the death of a miser), Nae yeojachingu-ui gwi-yeoun yeonae (내 여자친구의 귀여운 연애 The cute dating life of my girlfriend), and Gwigado (귀가도 Come back home). In 1997, her story “Chakhan saram Mun Seonghyeon” (착한 사람 문성현 Kind Mun Seonghyeon) won the 30th Hankook Ilbo Literary Award. In 2008, her collection Nae anui hwangmuji (내 안의 황무지 The desert inside me) won the 3rd Namchon Literature Prize, and in the same year she won the 23rd Manhae Literature Prize with her collection Soseol sseuneun bam (소설 쓰는 밤 A night of writing fiction).

Writing  
Yun has mostly dealt with stories of those cast out from Korean society such as the sick, the crippled, gangsters, the disabled, and women, as well as with relationships of families that are on the brink of breakdown. Mun Seonghyeon, the protagonist of "Chakhan saram Mun Seonghyeon" (착한 사람 문성현 Kind Mun Seonghyeon) is born with a disability. Literary critic Shin Seungyeop has said that “through the invisible paradox of the novel that such human dignity is realized through the special condition of a mentally disabled protagonist, this work is even more of a shock to us the reader,” and he pointed out that this “shines even brighter when in contrast with so many other characters who are crumpling without any dignity due to the destructive for of capitalism.”

Works  
 Sumeun Goljjagiui Danoungnamu Hangeuru (숨은 골짜기의 단풍나무 한 그루), Yeollimwon, 2018.
 Gwigado (귀가도 Come back home), Munhakdongne, 2011.
 Saranghara, huimangeopsi (사랑하라 희망없이 Love, Hopelessly), Minumsa, 2008.
 Yun Yeong-su Fiction Set – 2 Volumes - Nae yeojachingu-ui gwi-yeoun yeonae (내 여자친구의 귀여운 연애 The cute dating life of my girlfriend) + Nae anui hwangmuji (내 안의 황무지 The desert inside me), Minumsa, 2007.
 Soseol sseuneun bam (소설 쓰는 밤 A Night of Writing Fiction), Random House Korea, 2006.
 Jukum, aju natjeun hwansang (죽음, 아주 낮은 환상 Death, a Very Low Fantasy), Yunkeom, 1998.
 Jaringobiui jukeumeul aedoham (자린고비의 죽음을 애도함 Mourning the Death of a Miser), Changbi, 1998.
 Chakhan saram Mun Seonghyeon (착한 사람 문성현 Kind Mun Seonghyeon), Changbi, 1997.

Works in translation 
 Love, Hopelessly, Asia Publishers, 2017 (English)
 "Secret Lover" in Azalea: Journal of Korean Literature & Culture Volume 3, 2010 (English)

Awards 
 2011 The Violet Cultural Literary Prize 
 2008 23rd Manhae Literature Prize
 2008 3rd Namchon Literature Prize
 1997 30th Hankook Ilbo Literary Award
 1990 Modern Literature New Writer’s Prize

Further reading 
 Book review: Come back home (English) 
 장선미, 󰡔윤영수 소설 연구 : 주제와 연작기법의 상관관계를 중심으로󰡕, 중앙대학교 대학원, 2013. { Jang, Seon-mi, "A Study on Yun Young-su’s Fiction: With Focus on the Correlation of Subjects and the Series Method", Chung-Ang University Graduate School, 2013. }
 신미경, ｢1980~90년대 여성 작가 소설의 여성성 연구, 광주여자대학교, 2007. Shin, Mi-kyeong,
 백지은, ｢엄마의 풍경｣, 󰡔창작과비평󰡕, 2011년 가을호.  { Baek, Ji-eun, "The Sight of a Mother", Creation and Criticism, Fall Issue, 2011. }
 정철성, ｢시대의 우울한 풍속도｣, 󰡔실천문학󰡕, 1997년 여름호. { Jeong, Cheol-seong, “The Gloomy Cultural Landscape of the Times”, Silcheon Munhak, Summer Issue, 1997. }

References

External links 
 Interview  
 Book reading

Living people
1952 births
South Korean women short story writers
South Korean short story writers
People from Seoul
Seoul National University alumni
20th-century South Korean women writers
20th-century South Korean writers
20th-century short story writers
21st-century South Korean women writers
21st-century South Korean writers
21st-century short story writers